Kardia is the 2006 debut feature film by director Su Rynard. The film was produced by Paul Barkin and Larissa Giroux of Alcina Pictures in Toronto, Ontario, Canada.

Plot
The film tells the story of Hope, a pathologist who discovers that the experimental heart operation she underwent as a child has mysteriously linked her life with another. She revisits her childhood to uncover the secrets of her past.

Cast
Mimi Kuzyk  as Hope
Peter Stebbings  as Dad
Kristin Booth  as Sally
Ariel Waller  as Young Hope
Stephen Lobo  as Sanjay
Donna Goodhand  as Auntie Florrie
Emma Campbell  as Nurse
Steve Cumyn  as Surgeon
Nancy McAlear  as Scrub Nurse
Dylan Trowbridge  as Reporter
Nancy E.L. Ward  as OR Surgery Team Member

Awards
The film won the 2005 Alfred P. Sloan Foundation Feature Film Prize in Science and Technology at the Hamptons International Film Festival.

External links

 
 

2006 films
Canadian drama films
English-language Canadian films
2006 directorial debut films
2006 drama films
2000s English-language films
2000s Canadian films